The 2019 European Mountain Bike Championships was the 30th holding of the European Mountain Bike Championships, an annual mountain biking competition organized by the Union Européenne de Cyclisme (UEC). The championships comprised seven disciplines: downhill, cross-country cycling (XC), cross-country marathon (XCM), cross-country ultra-marathon, cross-country eliminator (XCE), trials, and beach race. The competitions for each discipline were held on different dates and at different venues, the only exceptions being cross-country and cross-country eliminator, which were contested on the same dates and in the same location.

Dates and venues
 Pampilhosa da Serra : 4–5 May (downhill)
 Vielha : 29 June (cross-country ultra-marathon)
 Kvam : 6 July (cross-country marathon)
 Brno : 25–28 July (cross-country, cross-country eliminator)
 Lucca : 4–6 October (trial)
 Dunkirk : 15 December beach race

Medal summary

Cross-country

Cross-country eliminator

Cross-country marathon

Cross-country ultra-marathon

Downhill

Trials

Beachrace

References

External links
Official website 

European Mountain Bike Championships
European Mountain Bike Championships
European Mountain Bike Championships
European Mountain Bike Championships
European Mountain Bike Championships
European Mountain Bike Championships
European Mountain Bike Championships
International sports competitions hosted by Portugal
International sports competitions hosted by Spain
International sports competitions hosted by Norway
International sports competitions hosted by the Czech Republic
International sports competitions hosted by Italy
European Mountain Bike Championships
European Mountain Bike Championships
European Mountain Bike Championships
European Mountain Bike Championships